New Taipei Industrial Park is a metro station in Xinzhuang District, New Taipei, Taiwan, served by both the Taoyuan Metro and the Taipei Metro.

The station opened for commercial service on 2 March 2017 with the commencement of operations of the Taoyuan Airport MRT and is served by both Commuter and Express trains on that line. Separate platforms opened with the commencement of operations of the first phase of the Taipei Metro Circular line on 31 January 2020.

Station interviews 
Both the Taoyuan Metro and Taipei Metro portions of the station are elevated; it is the only station in Taiwan serving two elevated rapid transit lines.

The Taoyuan Airport MRT portion of the station consists of island platforms with 4 tracks as it was designed for service by both Commuter and Express trains. It opened for trial service on 2 February 2017, and for commercial service 2 March 2017. The station began offering in-town check-in and luggage handling services in January 2020.

The Taipei Metro Circular line portion of the station features side platforms. The theme will be "flight".

As the Taipei Metro and the Taoyuan Metro are different systems, transfer passengers exit one system and then enter the other via the respective fare gates.

History
 2 March 2017: The station opened for commercial service with the opening of the Taipei-Huanbei section of the Airport MRT.
 31 January 2020: Taipei Metro’s Yellow line began service.

Station layout

Exits
Airport MRT:
 Exit 1: Northwest side of intersection of Wugong Rd. and Sec. 1, Zhongshan Rd. (New Taipei Blvd.)
 Exit 2: Southeast of connection level on the ground

Circular line:
 Exit 1: Northwest side of intersection of Wugong Rd. and Sec. 1, Zhongshan Rd. (next to Airport MRT entrance)

Around the station
 New Taipei Industrial Park
 New Taipei Changping Elementary School
 New Taipei Touqian Junior High School
 Zhongshan Bridge
 Crown Plaza (300m north of the station)
 Fuji Park (300m southeast of the station)
 Changping Park (400m southwest of the station)
 Fumei Park (600m south of the station)
 Wenzidi Wetland Park (900m southwest of the station)
 Circular Line

References

2017 establishments in Taiwan
Railway stations opened in 2017
Taoyuan Airport MRT stations
Transportation in New Taipei
Buildings and structures in New Taipei
Circular line stations (Taipei Metro)